= Myrileion =

Town of ancient Thrace

Coordinates: 41°12′53″N 29°06′32″E

Myrileion was a town of ancient Thrace, inhabited during Roman times.

Its site is located near Lykiou Limen in European Turkey.
